Guy Rupert Berryman (born 12 April 1978) is a Scottish musician, songwriter and producer, best known as the bassist of the rock band Coldplay and electronic supergroup Apparatjik. Raised in Kirkcaldy, he began to play bass from an early age, drawing influence from acts such as James Brown, Kool & the Gang and the Funk Brothers. In 2020, he launched a utilitarian-inspired fashion label named Applied Art Forms, working as its creative director and designer.

Berryman joined Coldplay with Chris Martin, Jonny Buckland and Will Champion at University College London, where he enrolled on a mechanical engineering degree but dropped out. The group signed with Parlophone in 1999, finding global fame after the release of Parachutes (2000) and subsequent records. He won seven Grammy Awards and nine Brit Awards as part of Coldplay. The band have sold over 100 million albums worldwide as of 2021, making them the most successful group of the 21st century.

Early life
Guy Rupert Berryman was born on 12 April 1978 in Kirkcaldy, Fife, Scotland, being the youngest son of engineer Rupert Berryman and his wife Elizabeth, whose family were merchants and factory owners in the city. Raised close to the Beveridge Park area, he described his childhood as one with "a huge sense of freedom", since he spent most of his time "getting up to no good" with friends and exploring the Raith Estate, ending up "lost for days on end". He stated that listening to Stevie Wonder's "My Cherie Amour" for the first time was one of the reasons why he became fond of soul music, funk and Motown, which would later influence his instrument preferences: "I can remember being maybe six years old, having this experience. I had obviously heard music in the background, in the house and stuff, but that was the first moment that I ever connected with music on a personal level".

With his father involved in building the Channel Tunnel as a project manager, Berryman's family moved to Kent when he was around 12 years old, the same period in which he began to play bass. He studied at Edinburgh Academy, playing drums and trumpet for the school band. During lessons, he observed being "a leftie who plays right-handed" and formed a group called Time Out, as "everyone was into bands like the Smiths and the Stone Roses, but I wanted to find a music that I could call my own. That was my form of rebellion". His education was continued at Kent College, Canterbury, where he spent his teenage years listening to acts like James Brown, Kool & the Gang and Pink Floyd. After graduating from high school, Berryman enrolled on a mechanical engineering degree at University College London, where he met Chris Martin, Jonny Buckland and Will Champion, eventually forming Coldplay. Unlike his bandmates, he did not finish the course.

Career

Coldplay

Berryman was the third member to join the band in 1997. Their college friend Kris Foof described him as "a quiet young man who had been put in 'Paris Block', the less populated block of rooms in Ramsay Hall. The rest of the band had been placed in 'New York Block', but not Guy, he was the outsider that the insiders all knew about, namely from his stockpile of musical instruments in his room". Martin commented having a wrong impression of Berryman when they first met: "He's not as scary as he looks – he's a lot nicer. Guy's the dark member of the band. Everyone thinks he's moody, soft-spoken is better". Along with Buckland, they recorded numerous demos without a drummer and, by November of that year, the trio called themselves Big Fat Noises. He later dropped out his mechanical engineering degree and enrolled in a seven-year architecture program at The Bartlett, which was abandoned to focus on playing bass. While his bandmates continued their degrees, he paid his rent by working as a bartender in a local London pub.

In the Coldplay: A Head Full of Dreams (2018) documentary, Berryman commented the promotion cycle for X&Y (2005) was a very turbulent period for the band, as they had frequent arguments, particularly between him and Martin: "I was probably much more opinionated back then, which was a huge pain in the ass for everyone, I don't know if I was trying to get away from myself or if I wasn't comfortable with myself, but I definitely had a drinking problem". When asked about Coldplay's creative process in an interview for The Howard Stern Show, they said while Buckland is usually more optimistic when either disapproving or giving his input on Martin's initial song ideas, Berryman is more critical, concluding that if he dislikes a track, "there's no point in ever playing it again". On the other hand, he was responsible for starting songs like "Magic" on his own, which was released as the lead single for their sixth album, Ghost Stories (2014).

Apparatjik

In 2008, Berryman formed a supergroup called Apparatjik with Magne Furuholmen from A-ha, Jonas Bjerre of Mew and producer Martin Terefe. Their first song, "Ferreting", was released as part of Songs for Survival, a charity album for Survival International. It also served as the musical theme for BBC Two series Amazon (2008). The band's debut live performance was held at the 11th CTM Festival, in Berlin, Germany. On 1 February 2010, their debut album We Are Here was released for digital download through their official website. In the next year, the group released Apparatjik World, an iPad application which contained songs the fans could help them produce. After 10 editions of the project, a final version titled Square Peg in a Round Hole (2012) was made available, being their second album and first physical release. On 20 March 2020, the band released a single called "Julia" on YouTube. However, it remains unknown whether or not Berryman contributed to the track, given he has not performed live with other members since 2011.

Business ventures
Along with two friends and car specialists, he created The Road Rat in 2019, a collectable quarterly magazine which celebrates classic automobiles. They do not intend to cover on-diary stories as "each issue is meant to be timeless". Berryman runs the project from his garage, being its creative director as well. In October 2020, he launched Applied Art Forms, a fashion label inspired by utilitarian, workwear, and military clothing. During an interview for British GQ, he stated "form and function are everything and, in designing the core pieces for this collection, I was driven by the need to create clothes that were the consummate expression of great design and perfect fabrics", further adding his main focus is on longevity, creating "styles that are relatively timeless, made from materials that will last and age beautifully". Applied Art Forms does occasional updates rather than following the seasonal fashion calendar. In the same year, he co-founded Bodyhero, a plant-based products start-up. His personal collection of clothes (which included Helmut Lang and Jil Sander pieces) was partially donated to Marrkt in 2022, with proceeds going to Save the Children's relief efforts on the war in Ukraine.

Other projects
Berryman guested on Magne Furuholmen's debut album Past Perfect Future Tense (2004) along with Champion, playing bass on the subsequent A Dot of Black in the Blue of Your Bliss (2008) as well. He wrote "Guy Romance Theme" and co-wrote "Bass Theme" for the soundtrack of The Longest Night in Shanghai, which was released in 2007. His most notable hobby throughout the years has been photography, taking candid pictures of his bandmates with disposable cameras on the Twisted Logic Tour and throwing them to the audience later. In 2009, he provided pictures for the booklet of A-ha's ninth album, Foot of the Mountain. During Music of the Spheres World Tour, he curated and narrated an exclusive photo diary for NME. Accompanied by Rik Simpson, as The Darktones, Berryman then produced Love You More (2010) and You&I (2011) for the Pierces, playing instruments such as guitar, omnichord, keyboards and percussion on the latter record. He also contributed to James Levy & the Blood Red Rose's debut album Pray to Be Free (2012), while the next year saw him produce DayBreak (2013) for New York-based rock band Hudson Hank.

Musical style
Having a style described as slick and relaxed, Berryman is usually seen using different models of a Fender Precision Bass, including editions such as Squier, Mustang, Jazz and Jaguar. The latter was used during the recording sessions for Viva la Vida or Death and All His Friends (2008). He mentioned the first "proper" bass used after joining Coldplay was a Rickenbacker 4001, which can be seen on the music video for "Shiver". His equipment also includes two Ampeg SVT amplifiers, two 15" cabinets, one 8"x10" cabinet and a Tone Bender pedal for distortion. In 2012, it was reported he bought a custom-made Hiwatt bass rig. The 200-watt amp head was hand-built in the United Kingdom and paired with a 4x12 cabinet, loaded with Fane speakers. When asked about his musical taste, Berryman stated that while it was "hard to condense it down", he "could not live without the Beatles or Motown". Additionally, he is known to be inspired by artists such as James Brown, Marvin Gaye, Kool & the Gang and the Funk Brothers.

Personal life
According to The Times, Berryman has an estimated wealth of £113 million as of May 2022. He is a known supporter of Raith Rovers, showing interest on photography, fashion and electronic gadgets as well. After six years of relationship, he married interior designer Joanna Briston in 2004. The couple filed for divorce three years later, but remained "very much in each other's lives" while raising their daughter. In 2014, he became engaged to Dutch model Keshia Gerrits after dating her for two years. They have two children and currently live in the Cotswolds, where Berryman owns a workshop to restore rare cars he collected in the last 15 years.

Before refurbishing automobiles, he took flying lessons and wanted to repair a Spitfire and a Tiger Moth, but eventually got bored of the idea. He is also a collector of synthesizers, cameras and watches: "I'm a completist when it comes to collecting, so I have to restrain myself [...] At least with cars you have to have space to keep them all in. But you can get a lot of watches into a drawer". In 2020, Berryman founded Dawghaus, an online catalogue aimed at curating "the best in design", promoting already well-acclaimed creations along with the ones he thinks that "deserve more attention". He is the only Coldplay member to have a separate social media account.

Discography

With Coldplay

 Parachutes (2000)
 A Rush of Blood to the Head (2002)
 X&Y (2005)
 Viva la Vida or Death and All His Friends (2008)
 Mylo Xyloto (2011)
 Ghost Stories (2014)
 A Head Full of Dreams (2015)
 Everyday Life (2019)
 Music of the Spheres (2021)

With Apparatjik
 We Are Here (2010)
 Square Peg in a Round Hole (2012)

Solo credits
 Past Perfect Future Tense (2004) – bassist
 The Longest Night in Shanghai Soundtrack (2007) – featured artist
 A Dot of Black in the Blue of Your Bliss (2008) – bassist
 Foot of the Mountain (2009) – photographer
 Love You More (2010) – producer
 You&I (2011) – producer
 Pray to Be Free (2012) – producer
 Daybreak (2013) – producer

See also
 List of people associated with University College London
 List of British Grammy winners and nominees
 List of best-selling music artists
 List of highest-grossing live music artists
 List of artists who reached number one on the UK Singles Chart
 List of Billboard Hot 100 number-ones by British artists

Notes

References

Further reading

External links

 
 Coldplay Official Website
 Coldplay on AllMusic
 Apparatjik Official Website
 Apparatjik on AllMusic

1978 births
Living people
20th-century British guitarists
20th-century Scottish male musicians
21st-century British guitarists
21st-century Scottish male musicians
Alternative rock bass guitarists
Alternative rock keyboardists
Alumni of The Bartlett
Alumni of University College London
Apparatjik members
Atlantic Records artists
British alternative rock musicians
British male songwriters
Capitol Records artists
Coldplay members
Parlophone artists
People educated at Edinburgh Academy
People educated at Kent College
People from Kirkcaldy
Scottish bass guitarists
Scottish businesspeople
Scottish fashion designers
Scottish keyboardists
Scottish male guitarists
Scottish multi-instrumentalists
Scottish photographers
Scottish pop guitarists
Scottish record producers
Scottish rock guitarists
Scottish songwriters